Joe Giella (born June 27, 1928) is an American comic book artist best known as a DC Comics inker during the late 1950s and 1960s period which historians and fans call the Silver Age of Comic Books. Due to his long and prolific career, Giella has been described as "one of the creators synonymous with the Silver Age of Comics."

Biography

Early life and career
Giella grew up in the Astoria neighborhood of Queens, and attended the School of Industrial Art in Manhattan. He also studied at the Art Students League in Manhattan, alongside future comics professionals Mike Sekowsky and Joe Kubert, and took commercial art courses at Hunter College. He began working in art at 17, he said in a 2002 interview, explaining that "when your parents are struggling to keep the house going, the first son in the family, especially in an Italian family, had to go to work." He described his first professional job as the humor feature "Captain Codfish", which the interviewer described as "a less-eccentric 1940s ancestor of SpongeBob SquarePants".  A standard reference, the Grand Comics Database, lists one "Captain Codfish" feature, running six pages with the art signed by Giella, in Hillman Periodicals' Punch and Judy Comics #11 (cover-dated June 1946).

Golden Age of comic books
Giella later freelanced for Fawcett Comics, commuting by bus to C. C. Beck's and Pete Costanza's studio in Englewood, New Jersey, to ink Captain Marvel stories. In either 1946 or 1947, he began freelancing for Timely Comics, the 1940s precursor of Marvel Comics, and shortly afterwards joined the staff. His start was rocky, however; as a 2012 article related,

"I would do any work that they offered," Giella had recalled in a 2005 interview. "I started out doing a little touch-up work, a little background work, a little inking, redraw this, fix this head, do something with this panel". Later, he assisted Syd Shores on Captain America Comics, finishing backgrounds, making pencil corrections and inking occasional pages. Giella did similar duty on Human Torch, Sub-Mariner, and humor stories. Inking soon became his specialty. In 1948, he joined the Naval Reserves, continuing with them for eight years.

His friend Frank Giacoia began drawing for DC Comics in the late 1940s; Giella joined him at that company in 1949. There, Giella inked stories featuring the Flash, Green Lantern, Black Canary and other characters under editor Julius Schwartz.

Into the Silver Age
During the early-1950s lull in superheroes, Giella inked Westerns penciled by Alex Toth (including the feature "Sierra Smith") and Gene Colan (on the series Hopalong Cassidy, splitting the work with fellow inker Sy Barry).

When the era called the Silver Age of comic books began with the resurgence of superheroes in 1956, Giella began inking science-fiction stories, including the feature "Adam Strange" in Strange Adventures, and Batman stories pencilled by the likes of Sheldon Moldoff (ghosting for Bob Kane), and Carmine Infantino. In the 1960s, he prominently inked Gil Kane on the series Green Lantern.

Comic strips
Giella also assisted on such King Features syndicated comic strips as Flash Gordon (inking Dan Barry in 1970), and The Phantom, on which he worked for 17 years (sometimes helping Sy Barry with pencilling when deadlines became too consuming for Barry). In 1991, Giella succeeded Bill Ziegler as artist on the Mary Worth daily and Sunday newspaper strip. Giella retired from Mary Worth in 2016, with his last strip appearing on July 23, 2016.

Other work
Outside comics, Giella did commercial art for advertising agencies such as McCann Erickson and Saatchi & Saatchi, and publishers such as Doubleday and Simon & Schuster.

Personal life
As of 2010, Giella lives in East Meadow, New York, on Long Island. His son Frank is an art history and cartooning instructor at Forest Hills High School, and a colorist for the comic strip Mary Worth, which Giella penciled and inked until 2016.

Accolades
Giella received the Inkpot Award in 1996. In 2016, he received the Hero Initiative Lifetime Achievement Award at the Harvey Awards. In 2017, Giella was the Guest of Honor at the 2017 Inkwell Awards ceremony at HeroesCon in Charlotte, NC (June 2017). In 2018, Giella was awarded the Inkwell Awards Joe Sinnott Hall of Fame Award for his many years of inking.

References

External links

 

1928 births
Living people
American comics artists
Comics inkers
American people of Italian descent
Artists from New York City
People from East Meadow, New York
Silver Age comics creators
High School of Art and Design alumni
Inkpot Award winners